Linden is a town in the district of Gießen, in Hesse, Germany. It is situated 6 km south of Gießen.

The town consists of the two parts Großen-Linden and Leihgestern.

Economy 
Since 2015 Swedish bank Klarna has an office in the town with a heavy focus on IT operations. In September 2019, the Linden office employed 90 people.

References

Giessen (district)